Credit refers to any form of deferred payment, the granting of a loan and the creation of debt.

Credit may also refer to:

Places
 Credit, Arkansas, a ghost town
 Credit River, a river in Ontario, Canada
 Credit River (Minnesota), a river in the United States
 Credit River, Minnesota, a city in the United States

Arts, entertainment, and media
 Credit (creative arts), acknowledging the ideas or other work of writers and contributors
 Closing credits, a list of credits played at the ending of a work
 Motion picture credits
 Opening credits, a list of credits played at the beginning of a work
 Credit (science fiction), a form of currency in some fictional works
 "Credit", a song on Meghan Trainor's 2015 album Title
 Game credit, a count of the current number of games that can be played in arcade games and pinball

Finance and accounting
 Credit bureau
 Credit card
 Credit line (disambiguation)
 Credit rating, an assessment of credit worthiness
 Credit risk, the risk of default on a debt
 Credit score, a representation of credit worthiness
 Debits and credits, types of bookkeeping entries
 Line of credit

Other uses 

 Course credit, a system of measuring academic coursework

See also
 
 
 Accreditation
 Credibility